Speed is a BBC television series about the history of fast vehicles, including aeroplanes, boats and cars. The show is presented by Jeremy Clarkson and consists of six episodes. Each focuses on a different aspect of speed. The series was first shown in the UK on BBC One in 2001, and was subsequently shown to an international audience on BBC World and in Australia on the HOW TO Channel. Jeremy Clarkson's Speed, a video containing an hour of highlights from the series was also released in 2001. The video was released on DVD, as part of The Jeremy Clarkson Collection in 2007.

List of episodes

External links
 
 

2001 British television series debuts
2001 British television series endings
Automotive television series
BBC television documentaries
Documentary television series about technology
English-language television shows